Philautus longicrus is a species of frog in the family Rhacophoridae.
It is found in Indonesia, Malaysia, and the Philippines.
Its natural habitats are subtropical or tropical moist lowland forests and subtropical or tropical moist montane forests.
It is threatened by habitat loss.

References

longicrus
Amphibians of the Philippines
Amphibians described in 1894
Taxonomy articles created by Polbot